Gaetano Quagliariello (born 23 April 1960) is an Italian politician, former Minister of Constitutional Reforms and current leader of Identity and Action party.

Biography 
Toti was born in Naples in 1960. During the University he was a member of the youth wing of the Italian Republican Party. In 1980s he became a member of the Radical Party led by Marco Pannella.

In 1994 he joined Forza Italia, the conservative party of the media tycoon Silvio Berlusconi and after the 2006 general election he was elected member of the Chamber of Deputies. After the formation of the People of Freedom, he joined it and was again re-elected after the general election in 2008.

After the 2013 election he was appointed Minister of Constitutional Reforms in the Grand Coalition led by Enrico Letta. After the reborn of Forza Italia, Quagliariello followed the Interior Minister Angelino Alfano, forming new political party called New Centre-Right, in support of Letta's government.

On 13 February 2014, following tensions with his left-wing rival and new Secretary of the Democratic Party, Matteo Renzi, Letta announced he would resign as Prime Minister the following day. On 22 February Renzi sworn in as new Prime Minister but Quagliariello, differently from the others NCD ministers, was not re-confirmed.

References 

1960 births
Forza Italia politicians
The People of Freedom politicians
New Centre-Right politicians
Identity and Action politicians
21st-century Italian politicians
Living people
Politicians from Naples
20th-century Italian people